Surfacing may refer to:

Surfacing (album), an album by Sarah McLachlan
Surfacing (novel), a novel by Margaret Atwood
Surfacing (film), a 1981 film directed by Claude Jutra based on Atwood's novel
Wet Bum (released as Surfacing in some international markets), a 2014 film directed by Lindsay Mackay
"Surfacing", a song by the band Slipknot from their album, Slipknot
"Surfacing", a single by music band Chapel Club included in their album Palace
"Surfacing", a song by Pink Floyd from The Endless River

See also 
Surface (disambiguation)